WMAQ may refer to:

 WMAQ-TV, a television station (29 digital/5 PSIP) licensed to Chicago, Illinois, United States
 WSCR, a radio station (670 AM) licensed to Chicago, Illinois, United States, which used the call sign WMAQ from October 1922 until August 2000
 WKQX (FM), a radio station (101.1 FM) licensed to Chicago, Illinois, United States, which formerly used the call sign WMAQ-FM
 Labis Airport, in Labis, Johor, Malaysia (ICAO code WMAQ)